Jackson is a town in Waldo County, Maine, United States. The town was named after General Henry Jackson of the Revolutionary War. The population was 610 at the 2020 census.

Geography
Jackson is drained by North Branch Marsh Stream. It has one pond, Drake Pond (13 acres).

Jackson is located on Route 7, south of U.S. Route 202. It is bordered on the north by Dixmont, on the east by Monroe, on the south by Brooks and on the west by Thondike.

The land area of the township is mostly forested, primarily a second growth northern mixed hardwood forest dominated by ash, poplar, oak, maple, pine, cedar, spruce, tamarack (larch) and hemlock. Forestry and livestock farming are the largest land uses, with hay the most common crop, corn silage the second most common. There are areas that have never been managed or cultivated, particularly bogs and remnant primeval forest in which large pine, hemlock and spruce trees predominate.

Demographics

2010 census
As of the census of 2010, there were 548 people, 237 households, and 152 families residing in the town. The racial makeup of the town was 95.6% White, 0.2% African American, 1.3% Native American, 0.2% Asian, and 2.7% from two or more races. Hispanic or Latino of any race were 0.4% of the population.

There were 237 households, of which 27.0% had children under the age of 18 living with them, 50.6% were married couples living together, 7.6% had a female householder with no husband present, 5.9% had a male householder with no wife present, and 35.9% were non-families. 29.1% of all households were made up of individuals, and 9.3% had someone living alone who was 65 years of age or older. The average household size was 2.31 and the average family size was 2.80.

The median age in the town was 44.6 years. 19.9% of residents were under the age of 18; 6.7% were between the ages of 18 and 24; 23.9% were from 25 to 44; 36.4% were from 45 to 64; and 13% were 65 years of age or older. The gender makeup of the town was 50.7% male and 49.3% female.

2000 census
As of the census of 2000, there were 506 people, 204 households, and 135 families residing in the town.  The population density was 20.1 people per square mile (7.7/km2).  There were 241 housing units at an average density of 9.6 per square mile (3.7/km2).  The racial makeup of the town was 97.23% White, 0.99% Native American, and 1.78% from two or more races. Hispanic or Latino of any race were 0.40% of the population.

There were 204 households, out of which 34.3% had children under the age of 18 living with them, 52.9% were married couples living together, 8.8% had a female householder with no husband present, and 33.8% were non-families. 26.5% of all households were made up of individuals, and 7.4% had someone living alone who was 65 years of age or older.  The average household size was 2.48 and the average family size was 2.96.

In the town, the population was spread out, with 26.7% under the age of 18, 6.7% from 18 to 24, 29.2% from 25 to 44, 28.9% from 45 to 64, and 8.5% who were 65 years of age or older.  The median age was 38 years. For every 100 females, there were 100.8 males.  For every 100 females age 18 and over, there were 95.3 males.

The median income for a household in the town was $26,705, and the median income for a family was $38,571. Males had a median income of $27,159 versus $20,000 for females. The per capita income for the town was $15,525.  About 15.2% of families and 21.0% of the population were below the poverty line, including 19.0% of those under age 18 and 18.4% of those age 65 or over.

Notable people 

 Ezra Abbot (1819–1884), noted biblical scholar
 David Augustus Boody (1837–1930), mayor of Brooklyn, NY, 1892–1893

References

External links
 Maine Genealogy: Jackson, Waldo County, Maine
 Jackson, Maine official town web site
 Jackson, Maine community web site

Towns in Waldo County, Maine
Towns in Maine